Roland Boer is an Australian theologian and scholar of Marxism. He was awarded the Deutscher Memorial Prize in 2014.

Career  
Boer obtained a bachelors degree in divinity from the University of Sydney. He was a professor at University of Newcastle (Australia).

In 2018, he was described by Xinhua as one of the world's top experts on Marxism. He teaches at the Dalian University of Technology's School of Marxism.

Personal life 
He runs the blog Stalin's Moustache.

Notable works

Political Myth: On the Use and Abuse of Biblical Themes  
Political Myth: On the Use and Abuse of Biblical Themes was released in 2009. It examines the political narratives that emerge out of the Hebrew Bible on the political right and provides a framework to crique those narratives from the political left.

The Sacred Economy of Ancient Israel 
The Sacred Economy of Ancient Israel examines the intersection of economics and religion in ancient Israel through the lens of Marxist critical theory.

The Criticism of Heaven and Earth 
The Criticism of Heaven and Earth is a series of books which explores the intersection of Marxism and religion. The fifth book in the series, In the Vale of Tears: On Marxism and Theology V, was released in 2012. In 2014 it was awarded the Deutscher Memorial Prize.

Socialism with Chinese Characteristics: A Guide for Foreigners 
In Socialism with Chinese Characteristics: A Guide for Foreigners, Boer describes Gordon H. Chang's The Coming Collapse of China (2001) as an example of the "China doomer" approach to historical nihilism. Other examples cited by Boer include anti-communist tropes and atrocity propaganda, as well as "Betrayal" narratives in which Deng Xiaoping is cast as a "traitor" who supposedly undid the achievements of China's revolution and brought capitalism to China may also be characterized as historical nihilism.

References 

Australian academics
Australian Marxists
Academic staff of Dalian University of Technology
Year of birth missing (living people)
Living people